River Rhythms may refer to:

River Rhythms (Albany) in Albany, Oregon
River Rhythms (Wisconsin) in Milwaukee, Wisconsin